Khao Yai–Khao Na Pha Tang and Khao Ta Phrom Non-hunting Area is a non-hunting area in Thong Saen Khan District of Uttaradit Province.

Geography
The non-hunting area consists of a larger northern part, including Khao Yai  and Khao Na Pha Tang  and a smaller southern part, including Khao Ta Phrom  and is neighbouring Ton Sak Yai National Park in the north and east. Streams, such as Huai Phaniat, Huai Pladuk and Huai Taew, flow into Khlong Tron a tributary of the Nan River.

Topography
Landscape is covered by forested mountains. The total mountained area is 99%, of which 60% high hill slope area (upper-slopes, mountain tops and shallow valleys) and 39% hill slope area (open slopes and midslope ridges). Plains count for 1%.

Flora
The protected area features mixed deciduous forest (87%), abandoned farms (6%), agricultural area (5%) and other area (2%).

Fauna
Mammals, there are 18 species from 18 families:

Birds, there are some 18 species, of which 6 species of passerine from 6 families:

and 12 species of non-passerine from 11 families:

Location

See also
 List of protected areas of Thailand
 List of Protected Areas Regional Offices of Thailand

References

Non-hunting areas of Thailand
Geography of Uttaradit province
Tourist attractions in Uttaradit province
1984 establishments in Thailand
Protected areas established in 1984